Alan Goodrope (born 3 May 1951) is an Australian former cyclist. He competed in the individual road race event at the 1976 Summer Olympics.

References

External links
 
 

1951 births
Living people
Australian male cyclists
Olympic cyclists of Australia
Cyclists at the 1976 Summer Olympics
Place of birth missing (living people)